Rock Creek is an  tributary of the Monocacy River in south-central Pennsylvania and serves as the border between Cumberland and Mount Joy townships.  Rock Creek was used by the Underground Railroad (at McAllister's Mill, "slaves would slosh through the water to throw off the tracking dogs that were pursuing them") and flows near several Gettysburg Battlefield sites, including Culp's Hill, the Benner Hill artillery location, and Barlow Knoll.

Tributaries

Blocher's Run is a stream which flows from Oak Ridge (triple watershed point at ) on the Gettysburg Battlefield eastward to the Rock Creek through and near areas of the Battle of Gettysburg, First Day.  During the Battle of Gettysburg Confederate soldiers took cover behind the trees that lined the stream.

Guinn Run  is a stream flowing southeastward from Cemetery Hill past the Gettysburg Museum and Visitor Center to Rock Creek.  The stream was bridged by the 1809 Gettysburg and Petersburg Turnpike Company and in the commemorative era by the United States War Department when Hunt and Slocum Avenues were built.  A dam was built on Guinn Run to form a pond for Fantasyland, Pennsylvania, through the 1960s and 1970s.
Stevens Run (Stevens Creek, Tiber) is a  stream which is a tributary of Rock Creek flowing over the Gettysburg Battlefield and through the borough of Gettysburg, Pennsylvania.  Within the borough the stream is in a concrete channel, including a covered portion.  From 1884 to 1942, the run was spanned by three bridges of the Round Top Branch railroad. Samuel Gettys' Tavern was located on the south side on the uphill slope of the now-named Stevens Run, and Rock Creek Church was approximately on the north bank of the now-named Carlisle Street and Stevens Run.  In 1902, a new bridge was built over the Tiber on Chambersburg Street.
Winebrenner Run  is a stream in Gettysburg, flowing eastward to Rock Creek originally from a Gettys-Black Divide triple point (with Stevens Run & Guinn Run) near Zeigler's Grove.  The Confederate military line along the stream was the starting point for the battle of East Cemetery Hill on the second day of the Battle of Gettysburg, and most of the upstream portion of the run was engineered  into underground drainage to open flow at the school complex near the Culp Farm at East Confederate Avenue.
White Run  is a stream which flows along East Cavalry Field and is an eponym of the Rock Creek-White Run hospital complex.  The run's mouth is at Rock Creek near the Trostle Farm along the Sachs Road, site of a hospital east of Round Top, Pennsylvania.

See also
List of rivers of Pennsylvania

References

Rivers of Pennsylvania
Rivers of Adams County, Pennsylvania
Tributaries of the Monocacy River